Hengdian Group, abbreviated as HG, is a Chinese private conglomerate founded by Xu Wenrong in 1975 in Hengdian, Zhejiang. It focuses on the fields of electrical and electronic, pharmaceutical and chemical, film and entertainment, and modern services. Since 1996, Hengdian Group has operated Hengdian World Studios.

History
In 1975, Xu Wenrong set up Hengdian Reeling Silk Factory, which was the predecessor of Hengdian Group. In the 1990s, it expanded into high-tech sectors such as hard magnets, soft magnets, and pharmaceutical manufacturing.

In 2004, Hengdian Group, Warner Bros. and China Film Group Corporation established the Warner China Film HG, which is a joint venture. In 2008, it established the Zhejiang Hengdian Film Production Company.

In 1989, Hengdian group founded Apeloa Pharmaceutical, which was listed on the Shenzhen Stock Exchange in 1997, covers active pharmaceutical ingredients and intermediates, pesticides, medical devices and medical services.

Hengdian Group also expanded into the lighting field in late 1990s，covering LED fixtures, lighting sources, smart lighting and automotive lighting.

In August 2019, Nanhua Futures, a subsidiary of Hengdian Group, was listed on the Shanghai Stock Exchange.

In March 2022, Apeloa Pharmaceutical Co., a public subsidiary of Hengdian Group, 
have signed on with UN-backed public health organization Medicines Patent Pool (MPP) to manufacture the generic version of Pfizer's oral COVID-19 treatment, nirmatrelvir.

References

Chinese companies established in 1975
Film production companies of China
Electronics companies of China
Entertainment companies established in 1975